The City of Wangaratta was a local government area located about  northeast of Melbourne, the state capital of Victoria, Australia. It was responsible for the urban area of Wangaratta.

History

Wangaratta was first incorporated as a borough on 19 June 1863, only nine days after the surrounding North Ovens Road District was proclaimed. On 15 April 1959, Wangaratta was proclaimed a city. It absorbed sections to its south on 31 May 1968 and 10 March 1976, and to its north on 1 October 1979, from the Shire of Wangaratta.

On 18 November 1994, the City of Wangaratta was abolished, and along with the Shires of Oxley, Wangaratta and various surrounding districts, was merged into the newly created Rural City of Wangaratta.

Wards
The city was not divided into wards, and its eight councillors represented the entire city.

Suburbs
 Laceby (shared with the Shire of Oxley)
 North Wangaratta (shared with the Shire of Wangaratta)
 Waldara
 Wangaratta*
 Wangaratta South

* Council seat.

Population

* Estimate in the 1958 Victorian Year Book.

References

External links
 Victorian Places - Wangaratta

Wangaratta City